Sheikh Mohmed Puzi bin Sheikh Ali (born 27 April) is a Malaysian politician. He was the Member of the Parliament of Malaysia for the seat of Pekan of Pahang since November 2022. He is a member of the United Malays National Organisation (UMNO) a component party of the ruling BN coalition.

He is the first MP from Pekan since 1982 not from the Razak family, as Najib Razak (1976-1982 and 1986-2022) and his father Abdul Razak Hussein (1959-1976) has hold the seat for six decades.

Election results

Honours 
  :
  Knight Commander of the Order of the Life of the Crown of Kelantan (DJMK) – Dato' (2010)
  :
  Knight Companion of the Order of Sultan Ahmad Shah of Pahang (DSAP) – Dato' (2013)
  Grand Knight of the Order of Sultan Ahmad Shah of Pahang (SSAP) – Dato' Sri (2013)

References 

Living people
Malaysian politicians
People from Pahang
Malaysian people of Malay descent
Malaysian Muslims
United Malays National Organisation politicians
Members of the Dewan Rakyat
Members of the 15th Malaysian Parliament
Year of birth missing (living people)